Ariaanje Coeymans House is a historic home located at Coeymans in Albany County, New York. It was built in c.1690 and has a 2- to -story main block with a 1- to 2-story wing. It is constructed of stone and brick and has a gambrel roof. Ariaanje Coeymans (1672–1743) was the heiress of a 17th-century flour and saw milling fortune. Her father, Barent Coeymans, held title to the land patent and died in 1710 intestate. Also on the property are the archaeological remains of mills and outbuildings.

It was listed on the National Register of Historic Places in 1972.

References

External links

 

Houses on the National Register of Historic Places in New York (state)
Houses completed in 1716
Houses in Albany County, New York
Historic American Buildings Survey in New York (state)
National Register of Historic Places in Albany County, New York
1716 establishments in the Province of New York